The Stow House is a U.S. historical landmark in Goleta, California. Formerly the headquarters of Rancho La Patera, the Stow House, in the Carpenter Gothic style, is now the headquarters of Goleta Historical Society which preserves and interprets the history of the Goleta Valley.

History
The Stow House was once the headquarters of Rancho La Patera, on the original Rancho La Goleta. In 1871, William Whitney Stow, a legal counsel for Southern Pacific Railroad in San Francisco, purchased  costing $28,677 for his son, Sherman P. Stow. Sherman Stow built a Carpenter Gothic Victorian home on the site and moved into the house with his bride, Ida G. Hollister, in 1873. The family expanded the house in two major renovations in the 1880s and 1910s. The house was occupied by three generations of Stow descendants.

Lemon orchard

In 1875, 3,000 lemon trees were planted in the first commercial lemon orchard planting in California. Sherman Stow's son, state senator Edgar Whitney Stow, set up a research laboratory at the ranch and developed disease resistant lemon rootstock of great value to local growers. The earliest commercial irrigation in the area took place on the ranch using the pond created by the Stows. The pond was expanded to create Lake Los Carneros which remains within the park.

Museum
The house museum displays family photographs and furniture, with stories of Sherman and Ida Stow and their descendants.

Nearby attractions
The Stow House is located next to Lake Los Carneros with walking trails and bird watching, Goleta Depot at the South Coast Railroad Museum, and other points of interest in Goleta. Wildlife including coyotes and bobcats have been observed from the trails.

References

External links

 Stow House - Goleta Valley Historical Society official site

Houses in Santa Barbara County, California
Goleta, California
Historic house museums in California
Museums in Santa Barbara County, California
Historical society museums in California
Houses on the National Register of Historic Places in California
National Register of Historic Places in Santa Barbara County, California
History of Santa Barbara County, California
Carpenter Gothic architecture in California
Carpenter Gothic houses in the United States
1873 establishments in California
Houses completed in 1873